Matti Koistinen (born January 18, 1986) is a Finnish professional ice hockey player who played with JYP Jyväskylä in the SM-liiga during the 2010-11 season.

References

External links

1986 births
Finnish ice hockey defencemen
JYP Jyväskylä players
Living people
People from Outokumpu
Sportspeople from North Karelia